Olearia arckaringensis, commonly known as Arckaringensis daisy, is a species of flowering plant in the family Asteraceae and is endemic to a restricted area of northern South Australia. It is a small, compact, rounded shrub with woolly-hairy foliage, coarsely-toothed, elliptic leaves and lavender or white and yellow, daisy-like inflorescences.

Description
Olearia arckaringensis is a small, compact, rounded shrub with a thick, woody base, its stems covered with white, woolly hairs.

Taxonomy and naming
Olearia arckaringensis was first formally described in 2008 by Peter J. Lang in the Journal of the Adelaide Botanic Gardens from specimens collected on Arckaringa Station in 2000. The specific epithet (arckaringensis) refers to the type location.

Distribution and habitat
This daisy-bush grows in low, open woodland on dissected breakaways on the Arckaringa Hills in northern South Australia.

Conservation status
Arckaringensis daisy is listed as "endangered" under the Australian Government Environment Protection and Biodiversity Conservation Act 1999. The main threats to the species include grazing and trampling by feral animals and livestock.

References

Flora of South Australia
arckaringensis
Plants described in 2008